The Folgore class was a pair of torpedo cruisers built for the Italian Regia Marina (Royal Navy) in the 1880s. The two ships— and —were designed by Benedetto Brin during a period of experimentation with the theories of the Jeune École in the 1880s. Both ships' careers were uneventful, and they spent most of their time in service conducting training exercises. Folgore was seriously damaged in a collision in 1889, and was thereafter reduced to reserve status, as the damage could not be completely repaired. She was eventually sold for scrapping in 1900, while Saetta served as a gunnery training ship from 1897 to 1908, when she too was dismantled.

Design

Characteristics

Folgore displaced  normally, while Saetta displaced . Their hulls were constructed from steel and featured a pronounced ram bow. The ships had a crew of between 57 and 70 that varied in size over the course of their careers.

Her propulsion system consisted of a pair of horizontal double-expansion steam engines manufactured by Hawthorn Leslie and Co., each driving a single screw propeller. Steam for the engines was supplied by four coal-fired locomotive boilers that were trunked into a single funnel amidships. In 1892, Saetta was re-boilered with oil-fired models for experimentation purposes.

The primary armament for the Folgore class was three  torpedo tubes. They also carried a small gun armament for defense against torpedo boats, consisting of two  43-caliber (cal.) guns, two  guns and four  25-cal. guns, all mounted singly. The ships carried no armor protection.

Ships

Service history
After entering service, both vessels were assigned to the main Italian fleet. They were primarily occupied with annual training exercises, along with occasional fleet reviews for monarchs, including one for the King of Italy, Umberto I in 1887 and German Emperor Wilhelm II in 1888. In 1889, Folgore was badly damaged in a collision with the protected cruiser  and could not be repaired to her original condition. As a result, she spent most of the rest of her career in reserve.

For much of the 1890s, Saetta was frequently reduced to reserve, in part to reduce maintenance on the vessel. Folgore made a temporary return to active service in 1895, when she joined Saetta for the annual maneuvers. In 1897, she was withdrawn from front-line service and employed with the gunnery school; her gun armament was accordingly increased in 1902 to provide a variety of weapons for gunnery trainees to practice operating. In the meantime, Folgore was stricken from the naval register in 1900 and broken up for scrap. Saetta continued in her service with the gunnery school until 1908, when she too was broken up.

Notes

References